Yavas (Javaz) is an urban locality (a work settlement) in the Zubovo-Polyansky District of the Republic of Mordovia, Russia. As of the 2010 Census, its population was 7,941. It is the location of women's prison corrective colony No. 2, Mordovia.

History
It was founded in 1931 as the headquarters of the fast-paced camp system for prisoners, dubbed Temlag (named after the town of Temnikov) of the Gulag system, later transferred to Dubravlag (Asherah camp). The settlement retains its value as one of the centers of the Russian penitentiary system. There are these penal institutions:

LC-385/2 (for women)
LC-385/11 (for men)
LC-385/8 (for males and females, the colony-settlement).

The status of urban-type settlement was assigned to the settlement by the decree of the Presidium of the Supreme Council of the Autonomous Republic of Mordovia on April 9, 1959.

Founded in 1930 on the railway line Potma – Barashevo, it served as an area for harvesting industrial wood and firewood for Moscow. At the beginning of the 1930s, the village became the center of the CTI network opened here ("Dubravlag"). A factory for wood processing was built in 1941-1945. By the mid-1950s, a school, hotel, bath, residential buildings and a stadium were built, and the House of Culture was renovated.

Administrative and municipal status
Within the framework of administrative divisions, the work settlement of Yavas, together with three rural localities, is incorporated within Zubovo-Polyansky District as Yavas Work Settlement (an administrative division of the district). As a municipal division, Yavas Work Settlement is incorporated within Zubovo-Polyansky Municipal District as Yavasskoye Urban Settlement.

Notable people
It is the birthplace of the Soviet/Russian cosmonaut Vladimir Dezhurov (1962).
Brittney Griner, a US basketball player, was imprisoned at Female Penal Colony IK-2 in Yavas, in 2022.

References

Notes

Sources

Urban-type settlements in Mordovia
Zubovo-Polyansky District
